Robert I de Lenoncourt, le père des pauvres,  died 25 September 1532, was a French prelate of the turn of the 16th century, known in his day for his works of charity among the poor of Reims.

Biography
Robert, was the son of Henri (died 1477), lord of Lenoncourt and Jacquette de Baudricourt (died 1493), is a descendant of a noble family of Lorraine who has distinguished himself in the ecclesiastical career. He is the uncle of Cardinal Robert de Lenoncourt and the great uncle of Cardinal Philippe de Lenoncourt.
 
Abbot commendatory of Tournus, prior of Saint-Pourcain (in the diocese of Moulins, in 1501 and 1509), Lenoncout was named to the archdiocese of Tours on 21 July 1484 that permutes for that of Reims on 7 April 1508.

As archbishop of Reims, he rebuilt the portal of the Saint-Remi basilica and decorated it with ten tapestries representing the life of the prelate. On 25 January 1515 he crowned King Francis I in the Cathedral of Reims.
He was known for his charitable works in his church, feeding, for example, every day three hundred poor people during a famine in Champagne in 1520.

According to some sources such as the Larmenius Charter, he was the Grand Master of a Knights Templar continuation.

References

16th-century Roman Catholic archbishops in France
1532 deaths
Archbishops of Reims